The University of Salamanca is a Spanish higher education institution, located in the city of Salamanca, in the autonomous community of Castile and León. It was founded in 1218 by King Alfonso IX. It is the oldest university in the Hispanic world and one of the oldest in the world in continuous operation. It has over 30,000 students from 50 different nationalities.

History 

Prior to the foundation of the university, Salamanca was home to a cathedral school, known to have been in existence by 1130. The university was founded as a studium generale by the Leonese King Alfonso IX in 1218 as the scholas Salamanticae, with the actual creation of the university (or the transformation of the existing school into the university) occurring between August 1218 and the following winter. A further royal charter from King Alfonso X, dated 8 May 1254, established rules for the organisation and financial endowment of the university, and referred to it for the first time by that name. A papal bull of Alexander IV in 1255 confirmed the Royal Charter of Alfonso X and granted universal recognition to the university's degrees.

The historical phrases Quod natura non dat, Salmantica non praestat (what nature does not give, Salamanca does not lend, in Latin) and Multos et doctissimos Salmantica habet (many and very versed Salamanca has) give an idea of the prestige the institution rapidly acquired.

In the reign of King Ferdinand II of Aragon and Queen Isabella I of Castile, the Spanish government was revamped. Contemporary with the Spanish Inquisition, the expulsion of the Jews and Muslims, and the conquest of Granada, there was a certain professionalization of the apparatus of the state. This involved the massive employment of "letrados", i.e., bureaucrats and lawyers, who were "licenciados" (university graduates), particularly, of Salamanca, and the newly founded University of Alcalá. These men staffed the various councils of state, including, eventually, the Consejo de Indias and Casa de Contratacion, the two highest bodies in metropolitan Spain for the government of the Spanish Empire in the New World.

While Columbus was lobbying the King and Queen for a contract to seek out a western route to the Indies, he made his case to a council of geographers at the University of Salamanca. While the geographers were skeptical of Columbus and his voyage calculations, the University of Salamanca always defended the theory of unknown territories to the west, and supported Columbus' voyage, believing that new territories may be discovered. In the next century, the morality and laws of colonization in the Indies were debated by the School of Salamanca, along with the development of the study of science, geography and cartography of the Americas, and as well as the study of general subjects of economics, philosophy and theology.

Like Oxford and Cambridge, Salamanca had a number of colleges (Colegios Mayores). These were founded as charitable institutions to enable poor scholars to attend the university. By the eighteenth century they had become closed corporations controlled by the families of their founders, and dominated the university between them. Most were destroyed by Napoleon's troops. In the 19th century, the Spanish government dissolved the university's faculties of canon law and theology. They were later reestablished in the 1940s as part of the Pontifical University of Salamanca.

Related affairs
The faculty renovated the theology department, laid the foundation for modern-day law, international law, modern economic science and actively participated in the Council of Trent. The school's mathematicians studied the calendar reform, commissioned by Pope Gregory XIII and proposed the solution that was later implemented. By 1580, 6,500 new students had arrived at Salamanca each year, amongst the graduates were state officials of the Spanish monarchy administration. It was also during this period when the first female university students were probably admitted, Beatriz Galindo and Luisa de Medrano, the latter probably being the first woman ever to give classes at a university.

Sorcery
In popular belief, the university was associated with sorcery. A certain cave in Salamanca was considered the site of a school of black magic.
In Romanian folklore, the devil runs a school of black magic named .

The name is derived from "Salamanca" and the wise king "Solomon".

Present day
Salamanca draws undergraduate and graduate students from across Spain and the world; it is the top-ranked university in Spain based on the number of students coming from other regions. It is also known for its Spanish courses for non-native speakers, which attract more than two thousand foreign students each year.

Today, the University of Salamanca is an important center for the study of humanities and is particularly noted for its language studies, as well as in laws and economics. Scientific research is carried out in the university and research centers associated with it, such as at the Centro de Investigación del Cáncer [Cancer Research Centre], Instituto de Neurociencias de Castilla y León or INCyL [Institute of Neuroscience of Castile and León], Centro de Láseres Pulsados Ultracortos Ultraintensos [Ultrashort Ultraintense Pulse Lasers Centre]. It is one of only two Hispanophone universities in the world that have a MoU with the United Nations to train language professionals for the organization. In conjunction with the University of Cambridge, the University of Salamanca co-founded the Association of Language Testers in Europe (ALTE) in 1989.

In 2018, the institution celebrated its eighth centennial.

Library 
The library holds about 906,000 volumes.

Notable people

Notable staff
Juan de Galavís, professor of theology; later became Archbishop of Santo Domingo and Archbishop of Bogotá
Francisco Elías de Tejada y Spínola, professor of Philosophy of Law and Natural Law
Enrique Gil Robles, professor of Natural Law
Paul Nuñez Coronel (d.1534), professor of Hebrew
Miguel de Unamuno, writer
Beatriz Galindo, (d. 1534), professor of Latin and rhetoric
Luisa de Medrano (d. 1527) professor of Latin. The secondary school in Salamanca, IES Lucia de Medrano was named after her.

Notable students
Miguel de Cervantes, author
Luis de Góngora
Fray Luis de León
Francisco de Vitoria
Pedro Calderón de la Barca
Bartolomé de Las Casas
Beatriz Galindo
Miguel de Unamuno
Bernardino de Sahagún

Other notable students and academic teachers include:
Gustavo Petro, President of Colombia
Aristides Royo, President of Panama
Francisco J. Ayala
Susana Marcos Celestino
Abraham Zacuto
Ignacio Baleztena Ascárate
Esteban de Bilbao Eguía
Domingo de Soto
Melchor Cano
Francisco Suárez
St. John of the Cross
Antonio de Nebrija
Gaspar de Guzmán, Count-Duke of Olivares
Gaspar Sanz
Pedro Gómez Labrador, Marquis of Labrador
Cardinal Mazarin
Mateo Alemán
Diego de Torres Villarroel
Pedro Salinas
Adolfo Suárez
Juan Zarate
Manuel Belgrano
Luis de Onís
Pedro Nunes
Simón de Rojas
Antonio Tovar
Gaspar Cervantes de Gaeta
Xavier Becerra
Ángela Abós Ballarín
Juan Pizarro Navarrete

See also

School of Salamanca
Pontifical University of Salamanca
List of medieval universities

Notes and references

Literature 
Manuel Fernández Álvarez, Luis E. Rodríguez San Pedro & Julián Álvarez Villar, The University of Salamanca, Ediciones Universidad de Salamanca, 1992. .

External links

VIII Centenario website
University of Salamanca language courses. Official spanish courses website 
Language courses in Salamanca University, marketed by a private company, Accom Consulting Spain S. L., an authorized University agent

 
Universities in Castile and León
1134 establishments in Europe
Educational institutions established in the 12th century
12th-century establishments in the Kingdom of León
Renaissance architecture in Salamanca
Public universities
Universities and colleges in Spain